Agromyces insulae is a Gram-negative, aerobic and non-motile  bacterium from the genus of Agromyces which has been isolated from soil from the Cát Bà Island in Vietnam.

References

External links
Type strain of Agromyces insulae at BacDive -  the Bacterial Diversity Metadatabase

Microbacteriaceae
Bacteria described in 2016